Cumbernauld and Kilsyth was a county constituency represented in the House of Commons of the Parliament of the United Kingdom from 1983 until 2005, when it was absorbed into the new constituency of Cumbernauld, Kilsyth and Kirkintilloch East as part of a major reorganisation of Scottish constituencies.

The similarly named constituency of Cumbernauld and Kilsyth continues for the Scottish Parliament.

Members of Parliament

Elections

Elections of the 1980s

Elections of the 1990s

Elections of the 2000s

References 

Historic parliamentary constituencies in Scotland (Westminster)
Constituencies of the Parliament of the United Kingdom established in 1983
Constituencies of the Parliament of the United Kingdom disestablished in 2005
Politics of North Lanarkshire
Cumbernauld
Kilsyth